Pimelea halophila is a species of flowering plant in the family Thymelaeaceae and is endemic to the southwest of Western Australia. It is an undershrub with elliptic leaves and compact clusters of 4 to 20 cream-coloured or white flowers surrounded by 3 or 4 green involucral bracts, and grows on islands in salt lakes.

Description
The stamens in male flowers are shorter than the sepals and the female style extends  beyond the end of the flower tube. Flowering occurs from August to October.

Taxonomy
Pimelea halophila was first formally described in 1988 by Barbara Lynette Rye and the description was published in the journal Nuytsia from specimens she collected near a Lake King salt lake. The specific epithet (halophila) means "salt loving".

Distribution and habitat
This pimelea grows in saline sand on islands raised slightly above the level of a salt lake in the Coolgardie and Mallee bioregions of south-western Western Australia.

Conservation status
Pimelea halophila is listed as "Priority Two" by the Western Australian Government Department of Biodiversity, Conservation and Attractions, meaning that it is poorly known and from only one or a few locations.

References

halophila
Malvales of Australia
Flora of Western Australia
Plants described in 1988
Taxa named by Barbara Lynette Rye